Daniel Albin Pfister (December 20, 1936 – November 9, 2020) was an American right-handed professional baseball pitcher in the Major Leagues from 1961 to 1964. He played for the Kansas City Athletics and spent his entire eight-season professional career (1957–1958; 1960–1965) in the Athletics organization.

Pfister allowed 238 hits and 142 bases on balls in 249 innings pitched over 65 Major League games. He struck out 156 batters.

After retirement from professional baseball, Pfister became a firefighter in Hollywood, Florida.

Pfister died on November 9, 2020, at the age of 83.

References

External links

1936 births
2020 deaths
Albany Senators players
American firefighters
Baseball players from New Jersey
Birmingham Barons players
Columbia Gems players
Crowley Millers players
Dallas Rangers players
Kansas City Athletics players
Major League Baseball pitchers
Pocatello A's players
Rochester/Winona A's players
Shreveport Sports players
Sportspeople from Plainfield, New Jersey